The Kalpa Sūtra is a Jain text containing the biographies of the Jain Tirthankaras, notably Parshvanatha and Mahavira. Traditionally ascribed to Bhadrabahu, which would place it in the 4th century BCE, it was probably put in writing 980 or 993 years after the Nirvana (Moksha) of Mahavira.

History
Within the six sections of the Jain literary corpus belonging to the Svetambara school, it is classed as one of the Cheda Sūtras. This Sutra contains detailed life histories and, from the mid-15th century, was frequently illustrated with miniature painting. The oldest surviving copies are written on paper in western India in the 14th century.

The Kalpa Sutra is ascribed to Bhadrabahu, traditionally said to have composed it some 150 years after the Nirvāṇa (samadhi) of Mahavira. It was compiled probably during the reign of Dhruvasena, 980 or 993 years after Mahavira's death.

Importance
The book is read and illustrated in an eight-day-long festival of Paryushan by Jain monks for general people. Only monks can read the scriptures, as in Jainism, this book has very high spiritual values.

Contents
Kalpasutra mentions nine Ganas and 11 Ganadharas of Mahavira. Bhadrabahu is mentioned as prime Ganadhara of Mahavira. Bhadrabahu's disciple Godasa is mentioned to have founded Godasa Gana.

See also
 Neminatha
 Parshvanatha

References

Citations

Sources
 
 
 
"The Kalpa Sûtra" translated in English by Hermann Jacobi is published by Motilal Banarsidass Publishers in Delhi in " The Sacred Books of the East" (Vol 22)  (1989)

External links

 Translations
 Kalpa Sutra text (1884 English translation)
 The Kalpa sutra, and Nava tatva (1848 English translation)

Atomism
Jain texts
Indian biographies